Leslie James Clenshaw (29 September 1905 – 8 January 1985) was an English professional footballer who played in the Football League for Barrow, Mansfield Town and Southend United.

References

1905 births
1985 deaths
English footballers
Association football forwards
English Football League players
Southend United F.C. players
Chelmsford City F.C. players
Barrow A.F.C. players
Mansfield Town F.C. players